Juan Carlos Moreno Rodríguez (born 19 April 1975) is a Spanish retired footballer who played as an attacking midfielder, currently a manager.

He appeared in 374 matches in Segunda División over 14 seasons, scoring 51 goals in representation of eight teams, mainly Numancia. In La Liga, he appeared for Barcelona and Numancia.

Playing career
Born in Barcelona, Catalonia, Moreno was a product of FC Barcelona's youth academy. He appeared in 14 first-team matches in the 1995–96 season courtesy of manager Johan Cruyff, following which he would return to the reserves.

Moreno went on to have several Segunda División stints, mainly in his native region: Albacete Balompié, UE Lleida (twice), Recreativo de Huelva, CF Extremadura and Terrassa FC. For the 2003–04 campaign he joined CD Numancia, being first-choice from the start and producing his best individual season in his first year, scoring eight goals in 41 games (3,476 minutes) as the club returned to La Liga after an absence of three years.

On 14 September 2008, after Numancia had achieved another top-flight promotion, Moreno opened a 4–3 away defeat against Real Madrid. He was used somewhat regularly during that season and scored three times, but the Soria side were relegated.
 
In the last day of the January transfer window in 2010, Moreno was loaned to second-tier FC Cartagena until the end of 2009–10. In June, aged 35, he retired having made 419 league appearances in a 16-year professional career – scoring 55 goals – although only 45 in the top division, 38 of those with Numancia.

Coaching career
Moreno remained at Numancia after his retirement, serving as assistant manager to Pablo Machín until taking control of the reserves of Tercera División in June 2013. He led them for three seasons, before terminating his contract two years early due to personal reasons. The side contested the playoffs in 2015, losing 4–0 on aggregate in the final to CD Izarra.

For less than a week in late December 2017, Moreno was manager of Segunda División B club CF Peralada in his native region, leaving before his first match again for his own reasons. On 21 October 2019, following the dismissal of Juan Carlos Unzué, he was appointed interim at Girona FC who were mid-table in the second tier. He managed his first professional game six days later, a goalless home draw with AD Alcorcón.

Managerial statistics

References

External links

1975 births
Living people
Spanish footballers
Footballers from Barcelona
Association football midfielders
La Liga players
Segunda División players
FC Barcelona Atlètic players
FC Barcelona players
Albacete Balompié players
UE Lleida players
Recreativo de Huelva players
CF Extremadura footballers
Terrassa FC footballers
CD Numancia players
FC Cartagena footballers
Spain youth international footballers
Spanish football managers
Segunda División managers
Tercera División managers
Girona FC managers